Freedom of religion in Colombia is enforced by the State and well tolerated in the Colombian culture. The Republic of Colombia has an area of 439,735 square miles (1,138,908 square kilometers) and its population is estimated at 46 million. Although the Government does not keep official statistics on religious affiliation, a 2001 poll commissioned by the country's leading newspaper, El Tiempo, indicated that the religious demography is as follows:

56.2% Roman Catholic Christians. 
20% Non-evangelical Protestant Christians
6.2% Evangelical Protestant Christians
11.3% No religious beliefs
3.6% Other faiths:
Seventh-day Adventist Church: about 180,000 members
The Church of Jesus Christ of Latter-day Saints: about 130,000 members
Jehovah's Witnesses: about 320,000 members.
Judaism: between 10,000 and 40,000 members.
Islam: figures unknown, probably  180,128.
60% reported not practising their faith actively.

Other religious statistics 

The National Administrative Department of Statistics (DANE) does not collect religious statistics, and accurate reports are difficult to obtain. However, based on various studies and a survey, about 90% of the population adheres to Christianity, the majority of which (70.9%) are Roman Catholic, while a significant minority (16.7%) adhere to Protestantism (primarily Evangelicalism). Some 4.7% of the population is atheist or agnostic, while 3.5% claim to believe in God but do not follow a specific religion. 1.8% of Colombians adhere to Jehovah's Witnesses and Adventism and less than 1% adhere to other religions, such as Islam, Judaism, Buddhism, Mormonism, Hinduism, Indigenous religions, Hare Krishna movement, Rastafari movement, Eastern Orthodox Church, and spiritual studies. The remaining people either did not respond or replied that they did not know. In addition to the above statistics, 35.9% of Colombians reported that they did not practice their faith actively. 

While Colombia remains a mostly Roman Catholic country by baptism numbers, the 1991 Colombian constitution guarantees freedom and equality of religion.

The Colombian Constitution of 1991 abolished the previous condition of the Roman Catholic Church as state church, and it includes two articles providing for freedom of worship:

Art. 13: States that "all people are legally born free and equal" and that they will not be discriminated on the basis of "gender, race, national or familial origin, language, religion, political or philosophical opinion".
Art. 19: Which expressly guarantees freedom of religion.  "Freedom of religion is guaranteed. Every individual has the right to freely profess his/her religion and to disseminate it individually or collectively. All religious faiths and churches are equally free before the law."

Currently, there seem to be no social controversy or problem arising from religious conflict.   Almost all cities and towns in Colombia have a church, but there are also temples, mosques and synagogues, especially in the largest cities.

External links
International Religious Freedom Report 2004 on Colombia, U.S. Bureau of Democracy.

References

Religion in Colombia
Colombia
Human rights in Colombia